Raj Kapoor (born Shrishti Nath Kapoor; 14 December 1924  2 June 1988), also known as The Greatest Show Man of Indian Cinema, was an Indian actor, film director and film producer who worked in Hindi cinema.

Kapoor is regarded as one of the greatest and most influential filmmaker and actor in the history of Indian cinema. He was the winner of several accolades including 3 National Film Awards and 11 Filmfare Awards in India. The Filmfare Lifetime Achievement Award is named after Raj Kapoor. He was a two-time nominee for the Palme d'Or grand prize at the Cannes Film Festival for his films Awaara (1951) and Boot Polish (1954). His performance  in Awaara was ranked as one of the top ten greatest performances of all time by Time magazine. His films attracted worldwide audiences, particularly in Asia and Europe. He was called the Clark Gable of the Indian film industry.

The Government of India honoured him with the Padma Bhushan in 1971 for his contributions to the arts. India's highest award in cinema the Dadasaheb Phalke Award was bestowed him in 1987 by the Government of India.

International honours and recognitions 

 Kapoor was nominated for the Grand Prize at the 1953 Cannes Film Festival for Awaara
 Kapoor was also nominated for the Grand Prize for Boot Polish 
 In 1955, he was conferred with an honorary degree in Tehran.
 His film Jagte Raho (1956) also won the Crystal Globe award at the Karlovy Vary International Film Festival.
 A Raj Kapoor Film Festival was held on his 75th Birth Anniversary at the Cultural Centre of Russia on 17 January 2000.
 The 55th Cannes International Film Festival, which was held from 16 to 26 May 2002, comprised a Raj Kapoor Retrospective as a tribute to the showman.
 The prestigious Centre Georges Pompidou in Paris was hosting an important 3-month long festival of popular Indian cinema from February to April 2004, dedicated to five great Indian film personalities: Raj Kapoor, Guru Dutt, Mehboob Khan, Bimal Roy and V. Shantaram.
 A Raj Kapoor film festival was held in The Netherlands city The Hague from 22 May – 1 June 2008.
 A Raj Kapoor film festival will be held in the Omani capital Muscat from 27 May – 10 June 2008.

National honours and recognitions 

 Kapoor had been conferred with a "National Award" for cinematography for contribution to Indian cinema.
 In 1971, he was honoured with the Padma Bhushan, India's third highest civilian award from the Government of India.
 The Filmfare Lifetime Achievement Award is named after Raj Kapoor.
 The Government of Maharashtra has named a Life Time Contribution award and a Special Contribution Award in honor of Raj Kapoor.
 On 8 January 2001, he was honoured with the "Best Director of the Millennium" award by Hero Honda-Stardust 
 In 2002, he was named "Showman of the Millennium" at the Screen Awards
 In 2007, he was conferred with a "Special Award" at the Screen Awards

National Film Awards

Filmfare Awards 

Raj Kapoor had been nominated for 23 Filmfare Awards in all, winning 11.

Bengal Film Journalists' Association Awards

References

Bibliography

External links 

 Raj Kapoor - Awards and Nominations at the Internet Film Database

Lists of awards received by Indian actor
Raj Kapoor
Lists of awards received by film director